We Were Here may refer to:
 We Were Here (Boy album), released in 2015
 We Were Here (Joshua Radin album), released in 2006
 We Were Here (Turin Brakes album), released in 2013
 We Were Here (film), a 2011 documentary about the HIV/AIDS crisis in San Francisco
 We Were Here (novel), by Matt de la Peña
 We Were Here Tour, 2016 concert tour by American country musician Jason Aldean
 We Were Here (series), a series of puzzle-solving video games

See also 
 And While We Were Here, a 2012 film directed by Kat Coiro
 "Gonna Know We Were Here", a 2015 song by Jason Aldean
 We Were There, a series of historical novels written for children